Buchir (also Romanized as Būchīr and Boochir; also known as Būshīr) is a village in Buchir Rural District, in the Central District of Parsian County, Hormozgan Province, Iran. At the 2006 census, its population was 2,775, in 645 families.

References 

Populated places in Parsian County